Rudbeckia is a plant genus in the Asteraceae or composite family. Rudbeckia flowers feature a prominent, raised central disc in black, brown shades of green, and in-between tones, giving rise to their familiar common names of coneflowers and black-eyed-susans. All are native to North America, and many species are cultivated in gardens for their showy yellow or gold flower heads that bloom in mid to late summer.

The species are herbaceous, mostly perennial plants (some annual or biennial) growing to 0.5–3.0 m tall, with simple or branched stems. The leaves are spirally arranged, entire to deeply lobed, and 5–25 cm long. The flowers are produced in daisy-like inflorescences, with yellow or orange florets arranged in a prominent, cone-shaped head; "cone-shaped" because the ray florets tend to point out and down (are decumbent) as the flower head opens.

A large number of species have been proposed within Rudbeckia, but most are now regarded as synonyms of the limited list given below.

Several currently accepted species have several accepted varieties.  Some of them (for example the black-eyed susan, R. hirta), are popular garden flowers distinguished for their long flowering times.  Many cultivars of these species are known.

Rudbeckia is one of at least four genera within the flowering plant family Asteraceae whose members are commonly known as coneflowers; the others are Echinacea, 
Dracopis, and Ratibida.

Rudbeckia species are eaten by the caterpillars of some Lepidoptera species including cabbage moths and dot moths.

Etymology
The name was given by Carolus Linnaeus to honor his patron and fellow botanist at Uppsala University, Olof Rudbeck the Younger (1660–1740), as well as Rudbeck's late father Olof Rudbeck the Elder (1630–1702), a distinguished Naturalist, Philologist, and Doctor of Medicine (he had discovered the lymphatic system), and founder of Sweden's first botanic garden, now the Linnaean Garden at Uppsala. In 1730 Linnaeus had been invited into the home of the younger Rudbeck (now almost 70) as tutor his youngest children. Rudbeck had then recommended Linnaeus to replace him as a lecturer at the university and as the botanical garden demonstrator, even though Linnaeus was only in his second year of studies. In his book The Compleat Naturalist: A Life of Linnaeus, Wilfred Blunt quotes Linnaeus's dedication: 

So long as the earth shall survive and as each spring shall see it covered with flowers, the Rudbeckia will preserve your glorious name. I have chosen a noble plant in order to recall your merits and the services you have rendered, a tall one to give an idea of your stature, and I wanted it to be one which branched and which flowered and fruited freely, to show that you cultivated not only the sciences but also the humanities. Its rayed flowers will bear witness that you shone among savants like the sun among the stars; its perennial roots will remind us that each year sees you live again through new works. Pride of our gardens, the Rudbeckia will be cultivated throughout Europe and in distant lands where your revered name must long have been known. Accept this plant, not for what it is but for what it will become when it bears your name.

Species
Accepted species
 Rudbeckia alpicola Piper – showy coneflower - Cascades in Washington
 Rudbeckia auriculata (Perdue) Kral – eared coneflower - Alabama, Georgia, Florida Panhandle
 Rudbeckia californica A.Gray – California coneflower - California 
 Rudbeckia flava T.V.Moore - Colorado, Wyoming
 Rudbeckia fulgida Aiton – orange coneflower - eastern USA + Canada, Texas to Connecticut + Quebec
 Rudbeckia glaucescens Eastw. – waxy coneflower - northwestern California, southwestern Oregon
 Rudbeckia graminifolia (Torr. & A.Gray) C.L.Boynton & Beadle – grassleaf coneflower - Florida Panhandle
 Rudbeckia grandiflora (Sweet) DC. – rough coneflower - mostly east Texas to Missouri; scattered locales from Georgia to Ontario
 Rudbeckia heliopsidis  Torr. & A.Gray –  coneflower - Mississippi to Virginia
 Rudbeckia hirta L. – black-eyed Susan - widespread in USA and Canada
 Rudbeckia klamathensis  – Klamath coneflower - northwestern California
 Rudbeckia laciniata L. – cutleaf coneflower, green-head coneflower - widespread in USA + Canada
 Rudbeckia maxima Nutt. – great coneflower  - mostly east Texas to Missouri
 Rudbeckia missouriensis Engelm. ex C.L.Boynton & Beadle – Missouri coneflower - Texas to Illinois; mostly in Ozarks
 Rudbeckia mohrii A.Gray – Mohr's coneflower - Florida Panhandle, southern Georgia
 Rudbeckia mollis Elliott –  coneflower - Florida Panhandle, southern Georgia, Alabama, South Carolina
 Rudbeckia montana A.Gray – montane coneflower - Colorado, Utah, Oregon
 Rudbeckia newmannii Loudon 
 Rudbeckia nitida Nutt. – shiny coneflower - Florida, Georgia, Alabama, Louisiana
 Rudbeckia occidentalis Nutt. – western coneflower - from Colorado to Washington + northern California
 Rudbeckia scabrifolia L.E.Br. – roughleaf coneflower - Louisiana, eastern Texas
 Rudbeckia speciosa  – showy coneflower - eastern USA
 Rudbeckia subtomentosa Pursh – sweet coneflower - mostly Mississippi Valley
 Rudbeckia texana (Perdue) P.B.Cox & Urbatsch – Texas coneflower - Louisiana, eastern Texas
 Rudbeckia triloba L. – brown-eyed Susan - from eastern Texas to Quebec; isolated locales in Colorado and Utah

Formerly included
 Echinacea atrorubens (as R. atrorubens) 
 Echinacea pallida (as R. pallida)
 Echinacea purpurea (as R. purpurea)
 Helianthus angustifolius (as R. angustifolia)
 Helianthus porteri (as R. porteri)
 Helianthus radula (as R. radula)
 Ratibida columnifera (as R. columnaris or R. columnifera)
 Ratibida tagetes (as R. tagetes)

Uses
Many species are used in prairie restorations, for ornamental use, and by livestock for forage.  An abundance of these plants on a rangeland indicates good health. They are deer and rabbit resistant.

References

Bibliography

External links
 
 

 
Asteraceae genera
Flora of North America